The Ixtlán deer mouse (Habromys ixtlani) is a species of rodent in the family Cricetidae.

It is endemic to southwestern Mexico, and found in the Sierra de Juárez, a subrange of the Sierra Madre de Oaxaca in Oaxaca state.

Although it was originally described as a species, it was reevaluated by Musser in 1969, who determined it to be a subspecies of the Zempoaltepec deer mouse (Habromys lepturus). Another evaluation by Carleton et al. in 2002 of H. lepturus and the other species of the genus Habromys determined significant morphological differences between H. lepturus and H. ixtlani, and H. ixtlani was reclassified as a separate species.

See also

References

 Musser, G. G. and M. D. Carleton. 2005. Superfamily Muroidea. pp. 894–1531 in Mammal Species of the World a Taxonomic and Geographic Reference. D. E. Wilson and D. M. Reeder eds. Johns Hopkins University Press, Baltimore.

Habromys
Endemic mammals of Mexico
Rodents of North America
Fauna of the Sierra Madre de Oaxaca
Mammals described in 1964
Critically endangered biota of Mexico
Critically endangered fauna of North America